Zaireichthys wamiensis is a species of loach catfish endemic to Tanzania. It grows to a length of  SL. Its natural habitat is rivers.

References

Amphiliidae
Endemic freshwater fish of Tanzania
Fish described in 1989
Taxa named by Lothar Seegers